Kevin Billing (born 22 October 1944) is a former Australian rules footballer who played for St Kilda in the Victorian Football League (VFL). He was a member of the 1966 St Kilda Premiership team.

External links

Australian rules footballers from Melbourne
1944 births
St Kilda Football Club players
St Kilda Football Club Premiership players
Oakleigh Football Club players
Living people
One-time VFL/AFL Premiership players